The 2008 WPS Bathurst 12 Hour was an endurance race for Group 3J Performance Cars and Group 3E Series Production Cars. It was the sixth Bathurst 12 Hour to be held and the second since its 2007 revival. The race was won by Rod Salmon, Damien White and Graham Alexander driving a Mitsubishi Lancer Evolution. It was the first time a Mitsubishi had won the race.

Class structure
The event was staged at the Mount Panorama Circuit, Bathurst, New South Wales, Australia on 10 February 2008 with cars competing in the following classes:
 Class A - High Performance All Wheel Drive
 Class B - High Performance Rear Wheel Drive
 Class C - Hot Hatch Performance Cars
 Class D - Production Vehicles under $50,000
 Class E - Production Sports under $50,000
 Class F - Under 2.5 Litre Production
 Class G - Eco Diesel Over 3.5 Litre (No starters)
 Class H - Eco Diesel 3.5 Litres and Under

Results

References

External links
2008 WPS Bathurst 12 Hour - Hour by Hour Retrieved from www.bathurst12hour.com.au on 1 November 2008
2008 WPS Bathurst 12 Hour - Images Retrieved from www.trentwallis.com on 1 November 2008

Motorsport in Bathurst, New South Wales
WPS Bathurst 12 Hour